Trygve Waldemar Fiske (born 15 February 1987 in Frei, Norway) is a Norwegian jazz musician (upright bass), known from different Norwegian jazz bands and recordings.

Career 
Fiske was educated on the jazz program at Trondheim Musikkonsevatorium, and the Norwegian Academy of Music. He played in Heidi Skjerve Quartet Vegen Åt Deg (2012) and Hanna Paulsberg Concept Waltz For Lilli (2012). After receiving the Shell Oil Company's Jazz Scholarship in 2013, Fiske started up his own quartet, Waldemar 4. They have offered performances at Norwegian jazz festivals like Moldejazz and the Kongsberg Jazz Festival, and released their self-titled debut album in 2015.

Honors 
 2013: Shell's Jazz Scholarship

Discography

Solo albums 
 Within Waldemar 4
 2015: Waldemar 4 (Gigafon Records)

Collaborations 
 Within the Heidi Skjerve Quartet
 2012: Vegen Åt Deg (Øra Fonogram), including John Pål Inderberg & Vigleik Storaas

 Within the Hanna Paulsberg Concept
 2012: Waltz For Lilli (Øra Fonogram), including Oscar Grönberg & Hans Hulbækmo
 2014: Song For Josia (Øra Fonogram), including Oscar Grönberg & Hans Hulbækmo

 With Ine Hoem
 2015: Angerville (Propeller Recordings)

References

External links
WALDEMAR 4 at Moldejazz

1987 births
Living people
Norwegian University of Science and Technology alumni
Norwegian Academy of Music alumni
Norwegian jazz upright-bassists
Male double-bassists
Jazz double-bassists
Norwegian jazz composers
Musicians from Kristiansund
21st-century double-bassists
21st-century Norwegian male musicians